Osh riots may refer to:

Osh riots (1990)
2010 South Kyrgyzstan ethnic clashes